The Durban trolleybus system was part of the public transport network in Durban, South Africa, for more than 30 years in the mid-20th century.

According to several sources, the Durban system was the first such system worldwide to experience an accident involving an overturned trolleybus.  Thirty seven people were injured in that accident, which occurred on 5 March 1941.

Durban's trolleybuses were also unique in being fitted with fishing rod racks at the back.

See also
History of Durban
List of trolleybus systems

References

Further reading

External links

Transport in Durban
Durban
Durban